Malucha Pinto Solari (born 16 April 1955) is a Chilean actress, theater director, playwright and politician.

Biography

The daughter of Aníbal Pinto Santa Cruz (and direct descendant of the presidents Francisco Antonio Pinto and Aníbal Pinto Garmendia) and the Nicaraguan-Chilean dancer Malucha Solari, Malucha Pinto began her career on the telenovela , then debuted on Sábado Gigante in 1982 as Señorita Priscilla Caucaman in Los Eguiguren, a segment that ran until early 1987. Her next appearance was on the comedy program , where she originated several characters with actors such as Coca Guazzini and Gonzalo Robles. In 1992, Pinto, Guazzini, and Robles created a new comedy show on Televisión Nacional de Chile (TVN), Jaguar Yu, which was on the air until 1993.

Malucha Pinto and her husband Joaquín Eyzaguirre are the parents of a son with cerebral palsy named Tomás. In 1996, she wrote the book Cartas para Tomás dedicated to him. This remained on Chile's bestseller list for ten weeks and is now required reading in schools. It was the basis of the play Tomás, in which Coca Guazzini played the role of Malucha. 

In 1999 she won an  Award for Best Actress for her role in the telenovela .

In 2007, she played the leading role of Leonor Santa Cruz in the Chilevisión series .

Since 9 March 2011, she has been a member of the editorial committee of the weekly newspaper Cambio 21.

In 2011, Pinto directed the play La pasionaria, for which she was nominated for APES and Altazor Awards in 2012. That year she was invited back onto Sábado Gigante with Coca Guazzini, Gonzalo Robles, and Cristián García-Huidobro to revive Los Eguiguren.

In 2016 she received the Elena Caffarena Award for her contribution to the defense of women's rights in Chile. Also in 2016 she returned to Canal 13 to star in Preciosas, playing Marta, a woman in prison who is about to complete her sentence.

Filmography

Films

Telenovelas

TV series and specials

TV programs
 El show del Tío Alejandro
 Sábado Gigante/Los Eguiguren (1982–1987, 2012) – Srta. Priscilla
  (1987–1991)   
 Jaguar Yu (1992–1993) – Various characters
  (2012) – Sra. Lily
  (La Red, 2013) – Guest
 Sin Dios Ni Late (Zona Latina, 2013) – Guest
 Buenos Días a Todos (TVN, 2013) – Guest
  (La Red, 2013) – Guest
 Dudo (2013) – Guest
  (Mega, 2014) – Guest
 Buenos Días a Todos (TVN, 2015) – Guest
 Sin Dios Ni Late (Zona Latina, 2015) – Guest
 Me Late (UCV, 2016) – Guest
 Algo Personal (UCV, 2016) – Guest
 Bienvenidos (Canal 13, 2016) – Guest
Mi rincón (Chilevisión, 2017) – Guest
 (Chilevisión, 2018) – Guest
 (Chilevisión, 2018) – Guest

Books
 Cartas para Tomás (1996). 110 pages. Editorial Catalonia. .
 Cartas de la memoria. Patrimonio epistolar de una generación de mujeres (2007). 336 pages. Editorial Catalonia. .

References

External links

 

1955 births
20th-century Chilean actresses
21st-century Chilean actresses
Actresses from Santiago
Chilean women dramatists and playwrights
Chilean film actresses
Chilean telenovela actresses
Chilean theatre directors
Living people
Women theatre directors
Writers from Santiago
Chilean people of Nicaraguan descent
Members of the Chilean Constitutional Convention
Chilean actor-politicians
21st-century Chilean dramatists and playwrights